Atelognathus is a genus of frogs in the family Batrachylidae. Sometimes known as Patagonia frogs, these frogs are endemic to Patagonia (southernmost Argentina and Chile).

Species
There are seven species in the genus:
 Atelognathus nitoi (Barrio, 1973)
 Atelognathus patagonicus (Gallardo, 1962)
 Atelognathus praebasalticus (Cei and Roig, 1968)
 Atelognathus reverberii (Cei, 1969)
 Atelognathus solitarius (Cei, 1970)

Formerly, Chaltenobatrachus grandisonae was also included in this genus (as Atelognathus grandisonae), before being moved to its own monotypic genus.

References

 
Amphibians of South America
Batrachylidae
Fauna of Patagonia